Armin Schwarz (born 3 June 1968) is a German politician for the CDU and since 2021 member of the Bundestag, the federal diet.

Life and politics
Schwarz was born 1968 in the West German settlement of Arolsen and became member of the Bundestag in 2021.

References

Living people
People from Bad Arolsen
1968 births
Christian Democratic Union of Germany politicians
21st-century German politicians
Members of the Bundestag 2021–2025